Tihoubar or Aïne Tihoubar is a settlement and hot spring of 45 degrees Celsius in the Sahara Desert of eastern Algeria, Illizi Province. It lies in a valley, and the spring is said to bubble "amongst the undergrowth at the foot of a palm tree."

References

Populated places in Illizi Province
Hot springs